Puthencavu is a village in Alappuzha District of Kerala, India, located 2 km east of Chengannur along the southern bank of the river Pamba. 
The village is around 2 km from Arattupuzha, and can be easily accessed from Chengannur and Arattupuzha.

Education
Metropolitan Higher Secondary School, run by the  Catholicate and MD Schools Corporate Management of the Malakara Orthodox Syrian Church is located at Puthencavu.

Transportation
Chengannur Railway Station is the nearest railhead, and Cochin International Airport the nearest airport. The Century Multispeciality Hospital is located very near to Puthencavu Junction.

Structures
The 218-year-old Puthencavu St Mary's Orthodox Church  is located in the village. The remains of three leaders of the Malankara Sabha, Mar Thoma VI, Mar Thoma VIII & Geevarghese Mar Philoxenos are interred in the church.

Notable people
Mahakavi Puthencavu Mathan Tharakan hails from this village and has made significant contributions to the freedom movement and the Malayalam language. His son K. M. Tharakan was a president of the Kerala Sahitya Akademi, and a noted writer, novelist and critic.

References

External links
 http://www.alappuzhaonline.com/puthencavustmaryscathedral.htm
 http://wikimapia.org/17631221/Shaji-George-Chennattu

Villages in Alappuzha district